Strathan is a remote scattered coastal village, located in Bàgh an t-strathain Bay, which lies on the south shore of the sea loch, Loch Inver, in the Assynt district of the west coast of Sutherland, Scottish Highlands and is in the Scottish council area of Highland.

Strathan is situated less than 1 mile northeast of Badnaban, 1 mile north of Inverkirkaig, and 2 miles southwest of Lochinver

Populated places in Sutherland